Lower Austria ( or ; Austro-Bavarian: Niedaöstareich, Niedaestareich) is one of the nine states of Austria, located in the northeastern corner of the country. Since 1986, the capital of Lower Austria has been Sankt Pölten, replacing Vienna which became a separate state in 1921. Other large cities are Amstetten, Klosterneuburg, Krems an der Donau, Stockerau and Wiener Neustadt.

Geography
With a land area of  situated east of Upper Austria, Lower Austria is the country's largest state. Lower Austria derives its name from its downriver location on the Enns River which flows from the west to the east. The state has the second longest external border of all Austrian states.
It also borders the other Austrian states of Upper Austria, Styria and Burgenland as well as surrounding Vienna.

Lower Austria is divided into four regions, known as Viertel (quarters):
 Weinviertel or Tertiary Lowland (below the Manhartsberg)
 Waldviertel or Bohemian Plateau (above the Manhartsberg)
 Mostviertel (above the Vienna Woods)
 Industrieviertel (below the Vienna Woods).

These regions have different geographical structures. The hilly Weinviertel lies to the northeast, descends to the plains of Marchfeld in the east of the state, and is separated by the Danube from the Vienna Basin to the south, which in turn is separated from the Vienna Woods by a line of thermal springs (the Thermenlinie) running north to south.

Mountains 
 Schneeberg (Klosterwappen; 2,076 m)
 Rax (Scheibwaldhöhe; 1,943 m; highest summit: Heukuppe; 2,007 m – Styria)
 Ötscher (1,893 m)
 Dürrenstein (1,878 m)
 Schneealpe (Ameisbühel; 1,828 m; highest summit: Windberg; 1,903 m – Styria)
 Hochkar (1,808 m)
 Gamsstein (1,774 m)
 Stumpfmauer (1,770 m)
 Göller (1,766 m)
 Hochwechsel (1,743 m)
 Gippel (1,669 m)
 Großer Sonnleitstein (1,639 m)
 Großer Zellerhut (1,639 m)
 Gemeindealpe (1,626 m)
 Scheiblingstein (1,622 m) (not to be confused with Scheiblingstein (2,197 m), which is in Styria)
 Drahtekogel (1,565 m)
 Sonnwendstein (1,523 m)
 Obersberg (1,467 m)
 Königsberg (1,452 m)
 Großer Sulzberg (1,400 m)
 Reisalpe (1,399 m)
 Gahns (1,380 m)
 Tirolerkogel (1,377 m)
 Türnitzer Höger (1,372 m)
 Unterberg (1,342 m)
 Traisenberg (1,230 m)
 Dürre Wand (1,222 m)
 Hohenstein (1,195 m)
 Eisenstein (1,185 m)
 Hohe Wand (1,132 m)
 Großer Peilstein (1,061 m)
 Weinsberg (1,041 m)
 Hocheck (1,036 m)
 Nebelstein (1,017 m)
 Eibl (1,007 m)
 Hohe Mandling (967 m)
 Jauerling (961 m)
 Hoher Lindkogel also named Eisernes Tor (834m) 
 Anninger (675 m)
 Buschberg (491 m)

Other mountains in Lower Austria may be found at :Category:Mountains of Lower Austria.

Alpine passes 
 Semmering (985 m)
 Wechsel (980 m)

The state border with Styria runs over both passes.

Rivers 

Almost all of Lower Austria is drained by the Danube. The only river that flows into the North Sea (via the Moldau and the Elbe) is the Lainsitz in northern Waldviertel, the Erlauf river.

The most important rivers north of the Danube (on its left bank) are the Ysper, Kamp, Krems, Lainsitz, March and Thaya. South of the Danube (on its right bank) are the Enns, Ybbs, Erlauf, Melk, Pielach, Traisen, Schwechat, Fischa, Schwarza, Triesting, Pitten and the Leitha.

Lakes 
 Ottenstein Reservoir (4.3 km)
 Lunzer See (0.69 km)
 Erlaufsee (0.56 km, of which about half lies in Lower Austria)
 Erlauf Reservoir
 Wienerwaldsee (0.32 km)

Caves 

Lower Austria is rich in natural caves; in all 4,082 have been recorded. Most of the caves have formed in limestone and dolomite rocks and are therefore called karst caves. Cavities also form in the marble of the Central Alps and the Bohemian Massif. Among the largest caves in Lower Austria are:
 Ötscherhöhlensystem (Ötscher): 27,003 m long; union of the Taubenloch and Geldloch
 Pfannloch (Ötscher): 5,287 m long
 Lechnerweidhöhle (Dürrenstein): 5,252 m long
 Trockenes Loch (Schwarzenbach an der Pielach): 4,510 m long
 Hermannshöhle (Kirchberg am Wechsel): 4,430 m long
 Eisensteinhöhle (Bad Fischau): 2,341 m long
The last two are open as show caves, along with the Allander stalactite cave, the Unicorn Cave, the Hochkarschacht, the Nixhöhle and the Ötschertropfsteinhöhle.

Land use

History

The history of Lower Austria is very similar to the history of Austria. Many castles are located in Lower Austria. Klosterneuburg Abbey, located here, is one of the oldest abbeys in Austria. Before World War II, Lower Austria had the largest number of Jews in the country.

The names Lower Austria and Upper Austria are derived from the earlier names Austria below the Enns and Austria above the Enns, references to the river Enns. Going down from its source on the northern edge of the Central Eastern Alps, the river crosses Upper Austria, then on its lower reaches forms the boundary between Upper Austria and Lower Austria.

In the mid-13th century, it became known as the Principality below the Enns River.

Economy 
The gross domestic product (GDP) of the state was € 61.0 billion in 2018, accounting for 15.8% of Austria's economic output. GDP per capita adjusted for purchasing power was € 32,300, or 107% of the EU27 average in the same year. Lower Austria is the state with the second-lowest GDP per capita in Austria.

Demographics

Administrative divisions

Lower Austria is divided into four regions: Waldviertel, Mostviertel, Industrieviertel, and Weinviertel. The Wachau valley, situated between Melk and Krems in the Mostviertel region, is famous for its landscape, culture, and wine.

Administratively, the state is divided into 20 districts (Bezirke), and four independent towns (Statutarstädte). In total, there are 573 municipalities within Lower Austria.

Independent towns 
 Krems an der Donau
 Sankt Pölten
 Waidhofen an der Ybbs
 Wiener Neustadt

Districts 
 Amstetten
 Baden
 Bruck an der Leitha
 Gänserndorf
 Gmünd
 Hollabrunn
 Horn
 Korneuburg
 Krems-Land
 Lilienfeld
 Melk
 Mistelbach
 Mödling
 Neunkirchen
 Sankt Pölten-Land
 Scheibbs
 Tulln an der Donau
 Waidhofen an der Thaya
 Wiener Neustadt-Land
 Zwettl

References

External links

Country of Lower Austria - official webpage
Lower Austria - official visitor information webpage
 PhotoGlobe - georeferenced photos of Lower Austria

 
NUTS 2 statistical regions of the European Union
States of Austria
Wine regions of Austria